The pomarine jaeger (Stercorarius pomarinus), pomarine skua, or pomatorhine skua, is a seabird in the skua family Stercorariidae. It is a migrant, wintering at sea in the tropical oceans.

Taxonomy
Its relationships are not fully resolved; its mitochondrial DNA is most similar to the great skua, but from morphology and behavior, it is closer to the lesser skuas (such as the parasitic jaeger). The most likely explanation is extensive hybridization between the great and one species of lesser skuas, which resulted in a hybrid population that eventually evolved into a distinct species, the pomarine jaeger; or alternatively between the pomarine and a species of Southern Hemisphere skua, with the great skua being the hybrid offspring, perhaps appearing as recently as the 15th century. Judging from characteristics of the skeleton and behavior, the former seems more likely, as the pomarine jaeger shares several similarities with the "Catharacta" skuas, while the great skua does not seem much different from its Southern Hemisphere relatives.

The mtDNA difference between the pomarine jaeger and the great skua is one of the smallest between any two vertebrate species yet analyzed, being less than the variation found between different individuals of widespread species. The apparent capability for hybridization has led to the abolition of the separate genus Catharacta for the Southern Hemisphere and great skuas.

Etymology
The word "jaeger" is derived from the German word Jäger, meaning "hunter". The genus name Stercorarius is Latin and means "of dung"; the food disgorged by other birds when pursued by skuas was once thought to be excrement. The specific Pomatorhinus is from  Ancient Greek  poma, pomatos, "lid" and rhis, rhinos,  "nostrils". This refers to the cere, which the pomarine jaeger shares with the other skuas. Although it is sometimes erroneously referred to as the Pomeranian skua, the name of this species is unrelated to the Baltic Sea region of Pomerania.

Description
 
Identification of this jaeger is complicated by its similarities to parasitic jaeger and the existence of three morphs. Pomarine jaegers are larger than common gulls. They are much bulkier, broader-winged and less falcon-like than the parasitic jaeger, but show the same wide range of plumage variation. The flight is more measured than that of the smaller species. It has many harsh chattering calls and others which sounds like which-yew.

Light-morph adult pomarine jaegers have a brown back, mainly white underparts and dark primary wing feathers with a white "flash". The head and neck are yellowish-white with a black cap. Dark morph adults are dark brown, and intermediate morph birds are dark with somewhat paler underparts, head and neck. All morphs have the white wing flash, which appears as a diagnostic double flash on the underwing. In breeding adults of all morphs, the two central tail feathers are much longer than the others, spoon-shaped, and twisted from the horizontal. Juveniles are even more problematic to identify, and are difficult to separate from parasitic jaegers at a distance on plumage alone.

Behaviour

Breeding

This species breeds in the far north of Eurasia and North America. It nests on Arctic tundra and islands, laying 2–3 olive-brown eggs in grass lined depressions. Like other skuas, it will fly at the head of a human or other intruder approaching its nest. Although it cannot inflict serious damage, the experience is frightening and painful.

Feeding
This bird feeds on fish, carrion, scraps, smaller birds up to the size of common gull and rodents, especially lemmings. It robs gulls, terns and even gannets of their catches. Like most other skua species, it continues this piratical behaviour throughout the year, showing great agility as it harasses its victims. Only the Great Black Backed Gull, White-Tailed Eagle and Golden Eagle are known to take adult, healthy pomarine skuas.

References

External links

 Pomarine skua species text in The Atlas of Southern African Birds
 
 
 
 
 
 
 

pomarine jaeger
jaeger, pomarine
pomarine jaeger
pomarine jaeger
Articles containing video clips
Holarctic birds